"You've Got to Change Your Mind" is a song recorded as a duet between Bobby Byrd and James Brown. Released as a single in 1968, it charted #47 R&B. Brown & Byrd can be seen performing this song on the DVD set, "Live at the Boston Garden: April 5, 1968" The Extended Edition

References

External links
 James Brown & Bobby Byrd perform "You've Got To Change Your Mind" (YouTube Video)

Bobby Byrd songs
James Brown songs
Songs written by Bobby Byrd
Songs written by James Brown
1968 singles
Male vocal duets
King Records (United States) singles
1968 songs